Kylie Cronk (born 27 March 1984 in Toowoomba, Queensland) is a softball player from Australia, who won a bronze medal at the 2008 Summer Olympics. Cronk currently lives in Rockhampton, Queensland and works for the Queensland Government.

External links
 Australian Olympic Committee profile

1984 births
Living people
Australian softball players
Medalists at the 2008 Summer Olympics
Olympic bronze medalists for Australia
Olympic medalists in softball
Olympic softball players of Australia
Softball players at the 2008 Summer Olympics
Sportspeople from Toowoomba